Federal Medical Centre, Yola is a federal government of Nigeria medical centre located in Yola, Adamawa State, Nigeria. The current chief medical director is Auwal Abubakar.

History 
Federal Medical Centre, Yola was established on 21 August 1998. The hospital was formerly known as Yola Specialist Hospital, Yola.

CMD 
The current chief medical director is Auwal Abubakar.

References 

Hospitals in Nigeria